California's 14th State Senate district is one of 40 California State Senate districts. It is currently represented by Democrat Melissa Hurtado of Sanger.

District profile 
The district takes in parts of the southern Central Valley. It includes heavily Latino portions of Fresno and Bakersfield, along with the rural, largely agricultural communities in between.

Fresno County – 29.8%
 Fresno – 30.3%
 Orange Cove
 Parlier
 Reedley
 Sanger
 Selma

Kern County – 34.3%
 Arvin
 Bakersfield – 19.4%
 Delano
 McFarland
 Shafter
 Wasco

All of  Kings County
 Avenal
 Corcoran
 Hanford
 Lemoore

Tulare County – 49.1%
 Dinuba
 Farmersville
 Lindsay
 Porterville
 Woodlake

Election results from statewide races

List of senators 
Due to redistricting, the 14th district has been moved around different parts of the state. The current iteration resulted from the 2011 redistricting by the California Citizens Redistricting Commission.

Election results 1994 - present

2018

2014

2010

2006

2002

1998

1994

See also 
 California State Senate
 California State Senate districts
 Districts in California

References

External links 
 District map from the California Citizens Redistricting Commission

14
Government of Fresno County, California
Government of Kern County, California
Government of Kings County, California
Government of Tulare County, California
Government of Bakersfield, California
San Joaquin Valley
Corcoran, California
Fresno, California
Hanford, California
Lemoore, California
Porterville, California